Craig Wittus (born February 24, 1957) is a former professional tennis player from the United States.

Wittus enjoyed most of his tennis success while playing doubles. During his career, he won two doubles titles. He achieved a career-high doubles ranking of World No. 42 in 1983.

Career finals

Doubles (2 titles, 1 runner-up

External links
 
 

American male tennis players
Miami RedHawks men's tennis players
Sportspeople from Detroit
Tennis people from Michigan
Living people
1957 births